Oh Yoon (in Hangul: 오윤, April 13, 1946July 5, 1986) was a South Korean painter whose pieces focused on peoples' art. It was during the 1980s when military officials seized power and repressed opposition, notably in the Gwangju massacre in 1980. Hence, his artworks largely expressed interests in the joys and sorrows of citizens during the 1970s and 1980s.

Biography
Born in 1946, Yoon went to Department of Arts, majoring in sculpture at Seoul National University. His father, Oh Young-su, was a novelist. It is said that Yoon was greatly influenced by his grandfather and uncle, the great master of Dongrae crane dance. Dongrae crane dance is one of the most famed Korean traditional dances which describes the movement of cranes originated from Dongrae, current Busan.

Yoon was the first member of the artists movement "Reality and Speech" (현실과 발언), a grouping of young writers and artists, the group of which intended to express the suppression of Korean society. His pieces focused on social function of art, researching on the traditional Korean arts such as Minhwa, what-so-called shamanic paintings, Talchum and Gut, traditional form of exorcism.

His works are the shards of effortless research on people's lives with sarcasm and beauty of lines with sorrow or resentment which is commonly called Han(in Hangul:한). Through this way, he expressed Han based on lives of commoners in woodprints. Though his major was firstly sculptor, his woodprints have been appreciated to deal with shapes of people.

His works failed to gain enough attention before his death, which was later revalued as the icon of people's arts in the 1980s since the decade referred to the transition to the democracy in South Korea.

He died of Cirrhosis at the age of 40 after his first exhibition in Seoul.

In 2010, complete collection of O yoon was published by collaborative works and well-known poet Kim Chi-Ha also joined the project.

Works
Although he was a famed printmaker, his career actually started from a sculptor, while he didn't limit his ambition concentrating not only on printworks but also on modernized masks or illustrations.

Rhythmical movement of dancers were expressed under the concept of Buddhist painting, collage and mosaics to connect Korean arts further with Pop art and modernism. The works even extended to deal with Korean traditional ceremony of gut or exorcism.

One of the key images Mr.O would like to describe is Korean traditional exorcism, gut. The most popular image of gut is sword dance, which led his works to convey the motion of the traditional exorcism ceremony.

The titles of his works showed his style who paid attention to the lives of common people: e.g. ⟨Dawn of Labour⟩(노동의 새벽), ⟨The land⟩(대지), ⟨The song of sword⟩(칼노래) and ⟨The lemures⟩(원귀도). Though he failed to attain magnificent attention, his works have gained much larger attention since 2000s.

20th anniversary of his death were celebrated in major museums such as National Museum of Contemporary Art and Ghana Art center.

Marketing Series and Hell Paintings 

While the Korean Minjung artist O Yoon’s biographical details have been roughly outlined, his works have not been thoroughly examined. As for instance, O’s participation in the artist movement groups including Reality (현실) / Reality and Utterance (현실과 발언) have been well publicized throughout academia. And yet, in order to assess O Yoon as an artist, there exists a necessity to delve deeper within his works. While many different works constitute as part of his artistic career, the Marketing Series – and especially the first and fifth edition Hell Painting (지옥도) – allows for not only formal analysis of his artworks, but also permits the interpreter to grasp as well as critically evaluate O Yoon’s independent nature within the Minjung Movement. As such, this article aims to provide substantiation to the notion that O Yoon ought to be considered independent from other Minjung Artists as evidential from his incorporation of traditionally Korean and Buddhist motifs within his two Hell Paintings of the Marketing Series through formal analysis of the Hell Paintings within the Marketing series (Marketing 1 & Marketing 5).

The Marketing Series was published over the span of two years within the early 1980s. In 1980, O Yoon published Marketing 1: Hell Painting (지옥도) as well as Marketing 2: Paint (발라라), and in 1982 Marketing 3: Dress (걸쳐라), Marketing 4: Household Appliances (가전제품), and Marketing 5: Hell Painting (지옥도). All five paintings of the Marketing series address the changing socioeconomic landscape of Korea, and specifically aim to critique the influence of Western capitalism and the consequent rise of consumerism in Korea. A discrepancy can be identified between the three works Marketing 2; 3; 4 and the two Hell Paintings. While the former three works each address a target to satirize a specific consumer product and/or the consumer, the latter Hell Paintings include multiple different consumer products within the artwork itself. Taking Marketing 2, for example, there exists an explicit depiction of a woman with makeup applied on her face in the center of the drawing. As such, Marketing 2 has a single consumer product that is critiqued within, as well as staying true to explicitly satirizing the domain of consumerism stated in the title. On the other hand, however, the Hell Paintings differ in that they not only contain multiple facets of consumerism within, but also that their critique is focused on the more broader system of capitalism. As these works contain more nuanced satirical elements that incorporate multiple facets of consumerism, they differ from the non-Hell Painting Marketing Series in that they require the audience to be further engaged with the paintings in order for there to exist full comprehension of the paintings and their message.

The two Hell Paintings stand out in that their style is distinctively traditional Korean and Buddhist. This is found to be no surprise nor coincidence. O Yoon, having been inspired by the buddhist Si-Wang painting style (시왕도), had appropriated (차용) the Si-Wang painting within the Buddhist Hwa-Um Temple (화엄사). Within this Si-Wang painting exists ten gods of hell on the top portion, with the people that have been sent to hell on the bottom portion. The ten gods are designated within Buddhist culture as having the duty of judging the sins of the people sent to hell. When juxtaposing with the Hell Paintings, the two share multiple apparent similarities. The compositional similarities are one example; while it cannot be definitively stated that there exists a clear-cut division with the top half portion of the paintings being reserved for the gods of hell and the bottom for those suffering due to their punishments, there is indeed a hierarchical composition where the multiple gods of hell in O Yoon’s Hell Paintings appear to be standing above (further upwards within the painting, composition wise) relative to the people that are suffering.

Yet, O Yoon is obvious in having a clear objective of appropriating the Si-Wang painting within the Hwa-Um Temple. O Yoon’s Hell Paintings indeed share the same concept of people suffering due to the sins that have led to their punishments. However, this Si-Wang painting lacks a commonality as to what kind of sins were created by those that are suffering. When referencing to the memo that O Yoon includes within his 1982 Marketing 3, it is apparent that O Yoon’s intentions within his artworks lie on the utilization of them as a means of conveying a message, likewise to a language, as he addresses his period of abstinence from art between Reality and Reality and Utterance – (translation) “... How art restores the function of language has been my question for the longest time…”  As such, contrary to the Si-Wang painting, O Yoon’s Hell Paintings focus exclusively on the then Koreans’ influence of Western capitalism and their consumerism, which O Yoon most definitely considered as sins.

It is perhaps the appropriation of the Si-Wang painting that leads one to believe there exists a Buddhist influence within O Yoon’s Hell Paintings. One can realize, however, that such appropriation is indeed merely one of many buddhist influences that exists when formally analyzing the artwork. Of many, one such attribute that ought to be mentioned is the traditional Buddhist concept of Poetic Justice (권선징악). Note that very structure of the Hell Paintings is indeed of hell, and that the people depicted within the painting are considered to have committed a certain type of ‘sin’ to have been placed in hell and sentenced to torture. The very concept of Poetic Justice (권선징악) is that those that have committed sins ought to be punished, and those that have done good deserve to be commemorated.

With this in mind, one may now be in a position to analyze the minute motifs that fit into the Buddhist influence of Poetic Justice (권선징악). From both of the Hell Paintings, there exist consumer products such as Coca-Cola, Babam-Ba (바밤바), and more. Taking Coca-Cola in the first Hell Painting, for instance, there exists a can of Coca-Cola half submerged into an ice structure on the middle-left portion of the painting. Surrounding the Coca-Cola can and on top of the ice structure exists multiple people that appear to be unclothed, and perhaps shivering. Given the fact that O Yoon has been influenced by Buddhism and in particular the concept of Poetic Justice (권선징악), one can derive the assumption that O Yoon intended to portray how the unclothed people shivering on top of the ice structure act as the sinners, of which their sins lie in giving into the lure of Coca-Cola, which represents Western capitalism and consumerism. The repercussion for this sin in this instance, then, becomes the people being confined to being placed on this ice structure despite being unclothed.

Another example of Buddhist influence can be found in the center-right portion of the first Hell Painting. When magnifying closer to this portion of the painting, one is able to notice a mirror. In front of this mirror exists a person being held by his/her hair by one of the monstrous characters. In the reflection, however, exists a completely different picture – a painter, which is fully clothed (contrary to the person held by the monstrous character, which is clothed with only a pair of red shorts), painting a rather simplistic looking painting. Again, given the fact that there existed Buddhist influence within the Hell Paintings of the Marketing Series, one is able to note that the mirror is in fact an Ub-Kyung-Dae (업경대). Within Buddhism, an Ub-Kyung-Dae is used to depict the sins that one has created during his/her lifetime. Given this information, one is able to infer that the person held up in front of the Ub-Kyung-Dae was a painter in his/her life, and that his/her sin is in focusing on the Monochrome/Tansaekhwa movement that was popular during the time, of which O Yoon, being a Minjoong artist, would have been critical about.

The influence of the Korean traditional ideology of Satire & Humor/Irony (풍자와 해학) in the two Hell Paintings ought not to be gone unmentioned. O Yoon’s inclusion of Satire & Humor/Irony dates back to his college years, where he found this ideology within his interest of Korean tradition such as Gut (굿). The satirical elements can be found most prominently displayed throughout the first Hell Painting, where people are tortured by participating in the same consumerism that have made them sinners and placed them in hell in the first place. However, it is the Humor/Irony aspect found within the 5th Marketing series Hell Painting that ought to be discussed. Within the upper left and lower right sections, one is able to note four and two people confined to braces on their necks, respectively. Upon closer inspection, one is able to arrive at the conclusion that these individuals are all members of Reality and Utterance, which most definitely include O Yoon himself. Such inclusion of himself as well as other members of Reality and Utterance within the painting as one to criticize is undeniably and inherently an attribute of such humor and irony.

As such, from his Marketing series and specifically Hell Painting, O Yoon ought to be recognized as beyond an artist fixated on merely creating artwork that pleases the eyes of the audience; rather, he is an artist in the most fundamental sense, likewise to a poet or a writer, that is in constant conversation with the idea of using art as a medium for expression. Yet, it is the adoption of elements that are traditionally Korean and of Buddhist ideology within his work that separates him from other Minjung Artists and members of Reality and Utterance.

See also
 Oh Young-su: O Yoon's father and famed novelist
 Kim Chi-ha: A South Korean poet
 People's Revolutionary Party Incident

References

External links
 Naver Cast - O yoon
 Encyclopedia of Korean Culture - O yoon
 Doosan Encyclopedia - O yoon

1946 births
1986 deaths
South Korean democracy activists
South Korean printmakers
People from Busan
Seoul National University alumni
20th-century South Korean painters
20th-century printmakers